Ballyskeagh is a small village and townland situated between Lambeg and Drumbeg in County Down, Northern Ireland. In the 2001 Census it had a population of 186 people. It lies within the Lagan Valley Regional Park and the Lisburn City Council area.

Places of interest 

Ballyskeagh Bridge, a sandstone arched bridge situated over the Lagan Canal, was built between 1760 and 1779 by Thomas Omer, engineer in charge of the canal. It is a listed building.
McIlroy Park, connecting the Lagan towpath to Ballyskeagh and Dunmurry, was named after local footballer Jimmy McIlroy.
The Lock Keeper’s House, also built between 1760 and 1779, is a privately owned listed building.
To the west of the Lock Keeper's House, an enclosure, probably a rath, is situated.

Sport 
Ballyskeagh is the home of New Grosvenor Stadium, the football stadium of Lisburn Distillery F.C., which is also used as a greyhound racing stadium under the name Drumbo Park.

Notable residents 
Jimmy McIlroy

See also 
Tullynacross
List of villages in Northern Ireland

References

Further reading 
NI Neighbourhood Information System
Draft Belfast Metropolitan Area Plan 2015

External links 

Ballyskeagh Lockhouse

Villages in County Down
Townlands of County Down
Civil parish of Lambeg